Naar may refer to:
Devin E. Naar
 Naar, the god of darkness in the Lone Wolf book series
 Naar (Encantadia)
 The concept of Hell in Islam, see Jahannam